Bodianus neopercularis, is a species of wrasse from the family Labridae which is native to tropical and warm temperate waters of the Indo-West Pacific, particularly the Marshall Islands. A record of Bodianus opercularis from Palau has now been reidentified as this species.

References

Further reading
Parenti, Paolo, and John E. Randall. "Checklist of the species of the families Labridae and Scaridae: an update." Smithiana Bulletin 13 (2011): 29–44.

External links

neopercularis
Taxa named by Martin F. Gomon
Fish described in 2006